Milton LeGrand Wood III (August 21, 1922 – July 16, 2015) was a bishop suffragan in the Episcopal Diocese of Atlanta from 1967 to 1974.

Background
Wood was born in Selma, Alabama, on August 21, 1922, to Milton Wood Sr. and Roberta Hawkins Wood.  He attended the University of the South, receiving his bachelor's degree and later his Master of Divinity, graduating in 1945. Bishop Carpenter of the Episcopal Diocese of Alabama ordained him as a deacon on November 18, 1945, in St. John's Episcopal Church (Montgomery, Alabama), and later as a priest on August 24, 1946. In 1949, Milton Wood married Ann Scott.

In 1963, Bishop Randolph Royall Claiborne Jr. of the Episcopal Diocese of Atlanta called Father Wood to serve as Canon to the Ordinary.  He also served as rector of All Saints' Church, Atlanta, Georgia for eight years, having also served at the Appleton Home in Macon, Georgia.  In 1967 he was elected bishop suffragan to assist Bishop Claiborne.  He served in that capacity until 1974 when he was called to New York City to serve as the executive for administration at the Episcopal Church Center.  He retired in 1984 and died in 2015 at Montgomery, Alabama at the age of 92.

Consecrators

 John Elbridge Hines, 22nd presiding bishop of the Episcopal Church USA
 Charles C. J. Carpenter, 6th bishop of Alabama
 Randolph Royall Claiborne Jr., 5th bishop of Atlanta
N.B.: 625th bishop consecrated in the Episcopal Church.

References
 Atlanta Diocese Centennial History page on Bishop Wood.
 The Episcopal Church Annual. Morehouse Publishing: New York, NY (2005).

Notes

1922 births
2015 deaths
People from Selma, Alabama
20th-century American Episcopalians
Episcopal bishops of Atlanta